Kostobobriv is a village in Novhorod-Siverskyi Raion (district) of Chernihiv Oblast (province) in northern Ukraine. It belongs to Semenivka urban hromada, one of the hromadas of Ukraine.

Description

Kostobobriv was first founded in 1200. It is located near the Ugli Railroad Station, the second railroad station in the entire district.

Until 18 July 2020, Kostobobriv belonged to Semenivka Raion. The raion was abolished in July 2020 as part of the administrative reform of Ukraine, which reduced the number of raions of Chernihiv Oblast to five. The area of Semenivka Raion was merged into Novhorod-Siverskyi Raion.

See also
 Russia–Ukraine border

References

External links
 

Novgorod-Seversky Uyezd

Villages in Novhorod-Siverskyi Raion